Cláudio Adalberto Adão, or simply Cláudio Adão (born in Volta Redonda, 2 July 1955), is a former Brazilian football player. A gifted forward, Adão was the top-scorer of almost every championship he's played.

His first professional club was Santos FC, where he arrived in 1972. When Pelé left Santos in 1974, the club predicted a brilliant future ahead for Adão as Pelé's natural replacement. But they couldn't predict Adão would suffer a serious injury that would leave him off of the pitch for several months.

Physicians believed Adão's career to be prematurely ended when Flamengo's coach, Cláudio Coutinho (who was himself a physical fitness expert) asked his club to sign Adão.

Santos let Adão go and, at Flamengo, he underwent intensive physical therapy. The results were fantastic and Adão quickly became an idol. Not only at Flamengo, but in every other club he has played for until he retired, hundreds of goals later, at almost 40 years old.

In Brazil, Adão played for Botafogo, Vasco, Fluminense, Portuguesa-SP, Corinthians, Bangu, EC Bahia, Cruzeiro, Portuguesa-RJ, Campo Grande-RJ, Ceará SC, Santa Cruz, Volta Redonda FC, Rio Branco-RJ and Desportiva-ES.

His international career included FK Austria Wien, Al Ain FC, Benfica and Sport Boys.

Adão further represented Brazil in the 1989 edition of the World Cup of Masters, scoring a hat trick in the final against Uruguay.

After retirement, he managed several clubs, CSA, Ceará, Rio Branco-ES, and Volta Redonda FC, his current club. As Rio Branco-ES manager, they won the 2001 Campeonato Capixaba.

See also

Felipe Adão his son

References

1955 births
Living people
People from Volta Redonda
Brazilian footballers
Brazilian football managers
Association football forwards
Campeonato Brasileiro Série A players
Peruvian Primera División players
Santos FC players
CR Flamengo footballers
FK Austria Wien players
S.L. Benfica footballers
Fluminense FC players
CR Vasco da Gama players
Al Ain FC players
Botafogo de Futebol e Regatas players
Bangu Atlético Clube players
Esporte Clube Bahia players
Cruzeiro Esporte Clube players
Associação Portuguesa de Desportos players
Sport Club Corinthians Paulista players
Sport Boys footballers
Campo Grande Atlético Clube players
Ceará Sporting Club players
Santa Cruz Futebol Clube players
Volta Redonda FC players
Rio Branco Atlético Clube players
Sport Boys managers
UAE Pro League players
Centro Sportivo Alagoano managers
Volta Redonda Futebol Clube managers
Legião Futebol Clube managers
Clube Atlético Metropolitano managers
Mixto Esporte Clube managers
Brazilian beach soccer players
Pan American Games medalists in football
Pan American Games gold medalists for Brazil
Footballers at the 1975 Pan American Games
Medalists at the 1975 Pan American Games
Sportspeople from Rio de Janeiro (state)